Mou Shantao (born 1 March 1990, in Dalian) is a Chinese football player who currently plays for Nanjing City.

Club career
Mou Shantao started his professional football career in 2010 when he was promoted to Nanjing Yoyo's first squad. In July 2011, Mou signed for China League Two side Fushun Xinye. In March 2012, Mou transferred to China League Two side Guizhou Zhicheng and he was part of the team that won the 2012 China League Two division. In March 2014, Mou transferred to China League One side Shenzhen F.C.

On 26 February 2016, Mou transferred to Chinese Super League side Henan Jianye. On 13 March 2016, Mou made his Super League debut in the second match of 2016 season against Chongqing Lifan.

Career statistics
Statistics accurate as of match played 31 December 2020.

Honours

Club
Guizhou Hengfeng
China League Two: 2012

References

External links
 

1990 births
Living people
Association football midfielders
Chinese footballers
Chinese expatriate footballers
Footballers from Liaoning
Nanjing Yoyo players
Guizhou F.C. players
Shenzhen F.C. players
Henan Songshan Longmen F.C. players
Inner Mongolia Zhongyou F.C. players
Chinese Super League players
China League One players
Segunda División B players
Chinese expatriate sportspeople in Spain
Expatriate footballers in Spain